Hydrophorus praecox is a species of fly in the family Dolichopodidae. It is found in the  Palearctic .

References

External links
 Images representing Hydrophorus at BOLD

praecox
Insects described in 1822
Asilomorph flies of Europe
Taxa named by Johann Georg Christian Lehmann